Natasha Wodak (divorced Fraser, born 17 December 1981) is a Canadian long-distance runner. She competed in the 10,000 metres at the 2015 World Championships in Athletics in Beijing, China, placing 23rd. Wodak formerly held the Canadian 10,000m record.

In July 2016, Wodak was named to the Canadian Olympic team for the 2016 Summer Olympic Games, where she finished 22nd.

At the 2019 Pan American Games, Wodak won gold in the 10,000m with a time of 31:55.17, breaking the Games record by over 45 seconds. In June 2021, she qualified to represent Canada at the 2020 Summer Olympics.

September 25, 2022 she set a new Canadian women's marathon record of two hours 23 minutes 12 seconds, competing in the Berlin Marathon in Germany.

International competitions

Personal bests
Outdoor
1500 metres - 4:15.27 (Burnaby 2018)
5000 metres – 15:29.44 (Portland 2018)
10,000 metres – 31:41.59 (Palo Alto 2015)
10 kilometres – 31:59 (Ottawa 2015)
20 kilometres – 1:07:41 (New York 2015)
Half marathon – 1:09:41 (Houston 2020)
Marathon – 2:23:12 (Berlin 2022)

Indoor
3000 metres – 9:02.57 (Seattle 2013)

References

External links
Official website

1981 births
Living people
Sportspeople from Surrey, British Columbia
Canadian female long-distance runners
Canadian female marathon runners
Pan American Games track and field athletes for Canada
Athletes (track and field) at the 2015 Pan American Games
Athletes (track and field) at the 2019 Pan American Games
Pan American Games gold medalists for Canada
Pan American Games medalists in athletics (track and field)
World Athletics Championships athletes for Canada
Athletes (track and field) at the 2016 Summer Olympics
Athletes (track and field) at the 2020 Summer Olympics
Olympic track and field athletes of Canada
Athletes (track and field) at the 2018 Commonwealth Games
Pan American Games gold medalists in athletics (track and field)
Medalists at the 2019 Pan American Games
Commonwealth Games competitors for Canada
21st-century Canadian women